"Saturday Morning Fun Pit" is the nineteenth episode of the seventh season of the animated sitcom Futurama. It originally aired on Comedy Central on July 17, 2013. The episode was written by Patric M. Verrone and directed by Crystal Chesney-Thompson.

Plot
Amid angry protests from anti-television groups on the White House lawn, the head of Richard Nixon and the headless clone of Spiro Agnew try to watch a Saturday morning cartoon block, which features some of the series' characters in parodies of some well-known Saturday morning favorites:

 Bendee Boo and the Mystery Crew: A Scooby-Doo parody featuring guest appearances by George Takei, the Harlem Globetrotters and Larry Bird.
Purpleberry Pond: A Strawberry Shortcake-meets-The Smurfs parody made to advertise an excessively sugary cereal.
G.I. Zapp: A violent G.I. Joe parody that Nixon attempts to censor.

Reception
Dennis Perkins at The A.V. Club gave this episode a D, while Max Nicholson of IGN gave the episode a 7.7/10 "Good" rating, saying "This week's Futurama featured an overall enjoyable lampooning of Saturday morning cartoons, with no exceptional dud."

Patric M. Verrone was nominated for a Writers Guild of America Award for Outstanding Writing in Animation at the 66th Writers Guild of America Awards for his script to this episode.

See also
 Lost Mysteries
 Saturday morning cartoon
 Media violence

References

External links
 
 

2013 American television episodes
Futurama (season 7) episodes
Cultural depictions of Richard Nixon
Parodies of Scooby-Doo
Parodies of television shows
Television episodes about censorship
Metafictional television episodes
Parody television episodes